William Lowther, 1st Earl of Lonsdale, KG (29 December 175719 March 1844), also known as Sir William Lowther, 2nd Baronet, of Little Preston, from 1788 to 1802, and William Lowther, 2nd Viscount Lowther, from 1802 to 1807, was a British Tory politician and nobleman known for building Lowther Castle.

Early life
Lowther was the eldest son of Rev. Sir William Lowther, 1st Baronet, of Little Preston and Swillington, and his wife Anne Zouch.  His younger brother was Sir John Lowther, 1st Baronet, who also married a daughter of the 9th Earl of Westmorland. His father, an ordained priest who served as rector of Swillington from 1757 to 1788, inherited the estate of Swillington in 1763, upon the death of his first cousin Sir William Lowther, 2nd Baronet.

His father, a son of Christopher Lowther, was a grandson of Sir William Lowther. His maternal grandparents were Charles Zouch, vicar of Sandal Magna, and the former Dorothy Norton (daughter of Gervase Norton). Through his mother, his uncles were Henry and Thomas Zouch.

He was educated at Westminster, 1771, and Trinity College, Cambridge, 1776.

Career

Like many members of the Lowther family, he followed the politics of his cousin, Sir James Lowther, 5th Baronet (later the 1st Earl of Lonsdale), but he seems to have shown a tendency towards independence. Lowther was briefly Member of Parliament for Appleby in 1780, for Carlisle from 1780 to 1784 and for Cumberland from 1784 to 1790. In 1796, he was returned as Member of Parliament for Rutland, holding the seat until 1802.

On 15 June 1788, he succeeded his father as the second baronet, of Little Preston. In 1802, he inherited by special remainder the titles of Viscount Lowther and Baron Lowther from his third cousin twice removed, the 1st Earl of Lonsdale of the first creation, as well as his immense estates. He was also appointed to the northern Lord Lieutenancies of Cumberland and Westmorland. In 1807, Lowther was himself created Earl of Lonsdale and appointed a Knight of the Garter.

A coal magnate, he spent £200,000 on the Lowther estate and built a new Lowther Castle. A Tory in politics, he seems to have been tolerant and well-liked, disdaining sabbatarianism and serving as patron for a number of painters and authors, including William Wordsworth.

Personal life
On 12 July 1781, Lord Lonsdale was married to Lady Augusta Fane (died 1838), the eldest daughter of John Fane, 9th Earl of Westmorland and, his first wife, Augusta Bertie (eldest daughter and co-heiress of Lord Montagu Bertie, fourth son, by his second wife, of Robert Bertie, 1st Duke of Ancaster and Kesteven). Together, they were the parents of six children:

 William Lowther, 2nd Earl of Lonsdale (1787–1872), who never married, but had at least three illegitimate children he acknowledged.
 Hon. Henry Cecil Lowther (1790–1867), who married Lady Lucy Eleanor Sherard, daughter of Philip Sherard, 5th Earl of Harborough.
 Lady Elizabeth Lowther (d. 1869), who died unmarried.
 Lady Mary Lowther (1785–1863), who married Maj.-Gen. Lord Frederick Cavendish-Bentinck, son of the 3rd Duke of Portland, on 16 September 1820.  Lady Mary, an amateur artist, was tutored by Joseph Farington and Peter de Wint.
 Lady Anne Lowther (d. 1863), who married Sir John Beckett, 2nd Baronet on 20 January 1817.
 Lady Grace Caroline Lowther (d. 1883), who married William Vane, 3rd Duke of Cleveland on 3 July 1815.

Lowther also enjoyed fox hunting, serving as Master of the Cottesmore Hunt from 1788 to 1802 and 1806 to 1842.

Lord Lonsdale died at York House, Twickenham on 19 March 1844.

Gallery

References

External links

|-

|-

|-

|-

1757 births
1844 deaths
People from Westmorland
People educated at Westminster School, London
Alumni of Trinity College, Cambridge
1
Knights of the Garter
Lord-Lieutenants of Cumberland
Lord-Lieutenants of Westmorland
Lowther, William
Lowther, William
British MPs 1780–1784
British MPs 1784–1790
British MPs 1796–1800
Lowther, William
Lowther, William
Lonsdale, E1
UK MPs who were granted peerages
William
Masters of foxhounds in England
People from Cumberland